Brocchinia reducta  is one of a few carnivorous bromeliads. It is native to southern Venezuela, Brazil, Colombia, and Guyana, and is found in nutrient-poor soil. B. reducta adapts to different environments, when growing on rocks it uses its roots as anchors.

Structure
Brocchinia reducta, like many other bromeliads, forms a water-storing cup with its tightly overlapping leaves. The leaves surrounding the cup of B. reducta are coated with loose, waxy scales. These scales are highly reflective of ultraviolet light. Since many insects are attracted to ultraviolet (it is also reflected by many flowers), this is an efficient lure. The water in the cup also emits a sweet odor, which may serve to attract ants and other insects. B. reducta absorbs its nutrients from the outer cell wall, which is covered in trichomes that can transport molecules as small as 6.6 nm.

The loose scales provide a poor foothold for landing insects, causing them to slip into the water-filled cup and eventually drown.

References

Further reading

reducta
Carnivorous plants of South America
Flora of South America
Plants described in 1882
Taxa named by John Gilbert Baker